Tom Beck may refer to:

 Tom Beck (American football) (born 1940), American football player and coach
 Tom Beck (actor) (born 1978), German entertainer
 Tom Beck, fictional president of the United States in the film Deep Impact

See also
Thomas Beck (disambiguation)